Batu Gajah (population 133,422) is the seat of Kinta District, Perak, Malaysia. It is administered by the Batu Gajah District Council, formerly known as Kinta West District Council.

Etymology
The name Batu Gajah in  Malay means "elephant rock", it is presumably derived from two large boulders (batu, 'stone') that resembled elephants (gajah, 'elephant') found along the Kinta River. Folklore claims that huge elephant figures were made of stones to scare away the elephants that destroyed the villagers' sugar cane crops.

History
Famous for its tin mining long before the Independence Day of Malaya, Batu Gajah had been an ideal place for Chinese immigrants to stay and work during those years. This contributes to a significant percentage of Chinese in the population of Batu Gajah today. The Indian Settlement village (the name was changed to Kampung Baru Desa Changkat) at Changkat has a large Indian population of Tamils and also a small minority of Punjabis who built a Sikh temple which becomes the pride of the residents and a landmark in the village today.

Batu Gajah had an established pre-war British English school, which was renamed Sultan Yussuf School (SYS) after the war. The Sultan of Perak DYMM Sultan Azlan Muhibbuddin Shah Ibni Almarhum Sultan Yussuf Izzuddin Shah Ghafarullahu-lah is an alumnus of this school. Formerly known as the Government English School (GES), it was founded by Mr. Malai Perumal Pillay in 1907. The school was built from the rubble of an old jail. Over the years, it has produced many successful students.

Batu Gajah since lies on the bank of Sungai Kinta, a little downstream from the major confluence of Sungai Raya. It started out as one of the many villages of mukim Sungai Terap, developed under its titular chief, the Sri Amar DiRaja, the early 19th century.

Features 
The attractions here include two golf courses, Kinta Golf Club and Clearwater Sanctuary Golf Course, and nearby pre-independence castle built by a Scottish rubber plantation owner, Sir William Kellie Smith: Kellie's Castle.

There are many hawker stalls and restaurants serving food such as noodles, laksa, and Indian-Muslim mee goreng and mee rebus. Youths spend time at cybercafés and around the local supermarket. In recent years, Western style food franchises such as 7-Eleven, KFC, Marry Brown, OldTown White Coffee and Pizza Hut opened branches in the town. A supermarket named TF has opened and is in business.

Development
In recent years, Batu Gajah has seen a lot of improvement. 
In September 2012, Zhuzhou Electric Locomotive Co. Ltd., one of the major electric locomotive manufacturers in China, agreed to build a rolling-stock factory in Batu Gajah.

Transport

In 2007, Batu Gajah received a new Batu Gajah railway station. Near Kampung Pisang at the southern end of town, it replaced the old station at Jalan Pusing which is being turned into a museum and then foodstalls.

In addition, the Malaysian railway operator, Keretapi Tanah Melayu, is constructing a new central workshop in the vicinity of Batu Gajah to replace its facility in Sentul. Located near the new railway station, the centre will house repair workshops, training facilities and staff quarters. The center was scheduled for completion in August 2009 at a projected cost of RM 430 million.

A new four-lane highway connects to the Ipoh-Lumut Highway at Seputeh and ties to the North–South Expressway at Gopeng. The highway passes near the new railway station through Bemban at the West side of town.

Education

Primary schools 
 SK Sultan Yussuf
 SK St Bernadette's Convent
 SK Toh Indera Wangsa Ahmad
 SK Pusing
 SK Tanjung Tualang
 SK Seri Jaya
 SK Bakap
 SJK(T)Changkat
 SJK(T)Ladang Kinta Valley
 SJK(C)Yuk Kwan
 SJK(C)Thung Hon
 SJK(C)Bemban
 SJK(C)Bandar Seri Botani

Secondary schools 
 SMK Sultan Yussuf
 SMK St Bernadette's Convent
 SMK Toh Indera Wangsa Ahmad
 SMJK Yuk Kwan
 SMK Dato' Bendahara CM Yusuf
 SMK Pusing
 SMK Tronoh

Tertiary institutions 
 Batu Gajah Community College 
 GIATMARA Batu Gajah

Notable people
 David Fasken (1932–2006), English cricketer and businessman, was born in Batu Gajah
 Des Lock (born 1949), New Zealand Olympic rower, was born in Batu Gajah
 Dato' Rahim Razali, a renowned artist/director, was born in Batu Gajah
 Amy Mastura, a pop artist and actress, was born in Batu Gajah
 Augustine Paul, federal court judge known for presiding over the Anwar Ibrahim sodomy trials was born in Batu Gajah
 David Tibet, a British poet, singer (Current 93), outsider artist, and painter was born in Batu Gajah
 Toh Chin Chye, a Singaporean politician who served as the Deputy Prime Minister of Singapore from 1959 to 1968 was born in Batu Gajah
 Dato' Dr Afifi al-Akiti, the first Malay to hold a chair at the Faculty of Theology, University of Oxford was born in Batu Gajah
 Tuanku Aishah Rohani, the current Tunku Ampuan Besar of Negeri Sembilan and also Terengganu royal family member was born in Batu Gajah
 Raja Zarith Sofia, Permaisuri of Johor and also Perak royal family member was born in Batu Gajah Hospital
 Sultan Azlan Shah of Perak, the 34th Sultan of Perak and the ninth Yang di-Pertuan Agong of Malaysia, was born in Batu Gajah

Landmarks

Some heritage buildings and landmarks in Batu Gajah that are famous throughout Perak:

Kellie's Castle (an old unfinished castle built by a Scottish rubber tycoon)
Sri Maha Mariamman Hindu Temple of Kinta Kellas Estate
Tanjung Tualang Tin Dredge No. 5
Sultan Yussuf School or SMK Sultan Yussuf, the oldest school in Batu Gajah, established in 1907
Batu Gajah Prison, the second oldest in Malaysia after the Taiping Prison.
Batu Gajah old courthouse established in 1892
St. Joseph Catholic Church 
Kinta Golf Course
Batu Gajah Hospital
Royale Hotel Batu Gajah
God's Little Acre: A cemetery for the British pioneers, military servicemen, policemen, tin miners, planters and civilians named after the memorial cross erected by the Perak Planter's Association and others to commemorate their lives in fighting the Communist Insurgency 1949–1960.

See also
 Kinta District

References

External links

 Official Website of Batu Gajah District Council
 Rancangan Tempatan Majlis Daerah Batu Gajah 2025

Kinta District
Populated places in Perak